Ivan Christian Benjamin (born 25 February 1962) is a Sierra Leonean sprinter. He competed in the men's 100 metres at the 1984 Summer Olympics.

References

External links
 

1962 births
Living people
Athletes (track and field) at the 1984 Summer Olympics
Sierra Leonean male sprinters
Olympic athletes of Sierra Leone
Place of birth missing (living people)